"Always" is a song by American rock band Bon Jovi. The power ballad was released in September 1994 as a single from their second greatest hits album, Cross Road (1994), and went on to become one of their best-selling singles, with a million copies sold in the US and more than three million worldwide. The song reached number four on the US Billboard Hot 100, becoming his 11th and last top 10 hit. It was an international hit, peaking at number one in Belgium, Canada, Ireland and Switzerland, number two in Australia and the United Kingdom, and number four in Germany. "Always" was Alec John Such's final single with the band before he left in late 1994.

Song origin
The song was originally written by Jon Bon Jovi for the soundtrack to the 1993 film Romeo Is Bleeding, starring Gary Oldman as a corrupt cop and Mafia aide who is renounced by his wife. After being unimpressed by a preview screening of the movie – which was a critical and box office flop – he decided not to lend "Always" to the producers. Bon Jovi commented, "The script was great: the movie wasn't." He left the track on his shelf and forgot about it until John Kalodner, a friend and A&R executive, found it and convinced him to re-record and release the song.

Critical reception
Larry Flick from Billboard described "Always" as "a charming new tune that banks on a crisp guitar breeze generated by Richie Sambora and Jon Bon Jovi's familiar rasp." He added, "With lush orchestration by Michael Kamen and gradual shifts in tempo, grand track is easily one of the band's most interesting efforts to date. Prepare for deservedly active airplay well into the fall season." In his weekly UK chart commentary, James Masterton wrote, that it "is an epic ballad of the type they are so fond of penning and a bit of judicious promotion smashes it straight into the Top 5." Alan Jones from Music Week rated it four out of five, naming it Pick of the Week. He wrote, "An intense rock ballad, with strings and piano filling out the group's sound, and Jon Bon Jovi delivering a strong, stylish lead. Shame about the weak bridge. Even so, this is sure to soar with a TOTP appearance already in the bag." Jonathan Bernstein from Spin viewed it as "karaoke Bryan Adams".

Music video
The accompanying music video for the song was directed by American television director Marty Callner. It features Jack Noseworthy, Carla Gugino, Jason Wiles and Keri Russell. There is also an alternate version of the video that is just the band performing the song. "Always" was published on YouTube in June 2009. It has amassed over 905 million views as of December 2022.

Live performances
The song's powerful lyrics and power ballad sound made "Always" an instant hit at live concerts, but the high demand on Jon Bon Jovi's vocals have seen it rarely performed in concert following the band's 1995–1996 These Days Tour. The song is featured on the band's Live From London video. During the 2005–2006 Have a Nice Day Tour it was occasionally performed in the acoustic style heard on the band's 2003 This Left Feels Right album. The band performed the original version on their Lost Highway Tour, particularly in the UK leg. A live version performed on the final night of the Lost Highway Tour was included on the concert DVD Live at Madison Square Garden. Since then, the song in its original version has been occasionally performed during every tour.

Track listings

 US 7-inch single
A. "Always" (single edit) – 4:52
B. "Living in Sin" – 4:37

 US CD and cassette single
 "Always" (edit) – 4:52
 "Never Say Goodbye" – 4:49
 "Edge of a Broken Heart" – 4:33

 US maxi-CD single
 "Always" (single edit) – 4:52
 "I Wish Everyday Could Be Like Christmas" – 4:25
 "Living in Sin" – 4:37
 "Please Come Home for Christmas" – 2:53

 European and Australasian CD single
 "Always" (edit) – 4:52
 "Edge of a Broken Heart" – 4:33

 UK CD1
 "Always" (edit)
 "Always"
 "Edge of a Broken Heart"

 UK CD2
 "Always" (edit)
 "Always"
 "Edge of a Broken Heart"
 "Prayer '94"

 UK cassette single
 "Always" (edit)
 "Always"

Charts

Weekly charts

Year-end charts

Decade-end charts

Certifications

References

1994 songs
1994 singles
1990s ballads
American soft rock songs
Bon Jovi songs
European Hot 100 Singles number-one singles
Irish Singles Chart number-one singles
Mercury Records singles
Number-one singles in Switzerland
Rock ballads
RPM Top Singles number-one singles
Songs written by Jon Bon Jovi
Ultratop 50 Singles (Flanders) number-one singles